Siah Chal may refer to:
 Siah Chal, Rudsar, Gilan Province (سياه چال - Sīāh Chāl)
 Siah Chal, Talesh, Gilan Province (سياه چال - Sīāh Chāl)
 Siah Chal, Lorestan (سياه چل - Sīāh Chal)